This article shows all participating teams in the 2001 FIVB Volleyball Men's World Grand Champions Cup.













References

G
FIVB Men's Volleyball World Grand Champions Cup squads